The indeterminacy of translation is a thesis propounded by 20th-century American analytic philosopher W. V. Quine. The classic statement of this thesis can be found in his 1960 book Word and Object, which gathered together and refined much of Quine's previous work on subjects other than formal logic and set theory. The indeterminacy of translation is also discussed at length in his Ontological Relativity.  Crispin Wright suggests that this "has been among the most widely discussed and controversial theses in modern analytical philosophy". This view is endorsed by Putnam who states that it is "the most fascinating and the most discussed philosophical argument since Kant's Transcendental Deduction of the Categories".

Three aspects of indeterminacy arise, of which two relate to indeterminacy of translation. The last of these, not discussed here, refers to Quine's assessment that evidence alone does not dictate the choice of a scientific theory, as different theories – observationally equivalent – may be able to explain the same facts. The first refers to indeterminacy in interpreting individual words or sub-sentences. The second refers to indeterminacy in entire sentences or more extensive portions of discourse.

Indeterminacy of reference

Indeterminacy of reference refers to the interpretation of words or phrases in isolation, and Quine's thesis is that no unique interpretation is possible, because a 'radical interpreter' has no way of telling which of many possible meanings the speaker has in mind. Quine uses the example of the word "gavagai" uttered by a native speaker of the unknown language Arunta upon seeing a rabbit.  A speaker of English could do what seems natural and translate this as "Lo, a rabbit." But other translations would be compatible with all the evidence he has: "Lo, food"; "Let's go hunting"; "There will be a storm tonight" (these natives may be superstitious); "Lo, a momentary rabbit-stage"; "Lo, an undetached rabbit-part."  Some of these might become less likely – that is, become more unwieldy hypotheses – in the light of subsequent observation.  Other translations can be ruled out only by querying the natives: An affirmative answer to "Is this the same gavagai as that earlier one?" rules out some possible translations.  But these questions can only be asked once the linguist has mastered much of the natives' grammar and abstract vocabulary; that in turn can only be done on the basis of hypotheses derived from simpler, observation-connected bits of language; and those sentences, on their own, admit of multiple interpretations.

The situation is made worse when more abstract words are used, not directly attached to public observation:

These observations about the need for context brings up the next topic, holophrastic indeterminacy.

Holophrastic indeterminacy

It is confusing that Quine's choice of meaning for 'holophrastic', contrasting it with sub-sentential phrases, appears to run counter to its accepted meaning in linguistics, "expressing a complex of ideas in a single word or in a fixed phrase".
 
Quine considers the methods available to a field linguist attempting to translate a hitherto unknown language he calls Arunta. He suggests that there are always different ways one might break a sentence into words, and different ways to distribute functions among words. Any hypothesis of translation could be defended only by appeal to context, by determining what other sentences a native would utter. But the same indeterminacy appears there: any hypothesis can be defended if one adopts enough compensatory hypotheses about other parts of the language.

General remarks
Indeterminacy of translation also applies to the interpretation of speakers of one's own language, and even to one's past utterances. This does not lead to skepticism about meaning – either that meaning is hidden and unknowable, or that words are meaningless. However, when combined with a (more or less behavioristic) premise that everything that can be learned about the meaning of a speaker's utterances can be learned from the speaker's behavior, the indeterminacy of translation may be felt to suggest that there are no such entities as "meanings"; in this connection, it is highlighted (or claimed) that the notion of synonymy has no operational definition. But saying that there are no "meanings" is not to say that words are not meaningful or significant.

Quine denies an absolute standard of right and wrong in translating one language into another; rather, he adopts a pragmatic stance toward translation, that a translation can be consistent with the behavioral evidence. And while Quine does admit the existence of standards for good and bad translations, such standards are peripheral to his philosophical concern with the act of translation, hinging upon such pragmatic issues as speed of translation, and the lucidity and conciseness of the results. The key point is that more than one translation meets these criteria, and hence that no unique meaning can be assigned to words and sentences.

Analytic–synthetic distinction

In Quine's view, the indeterminacy of translation leads to the inability to separate analytic statements whose validity lies in the usage of language from synthetic statements, those that assert facts about the world. The argument hinges on the role of synonymy in analytic statements, "A natural suggestion, deserving close examination, is that the synonymy of two linguistic forms consists simply in their interchangeability in all contexts without change of truth value". However, Quine argues, because of the indeterminacy of translation, any attempt to define 'analyticity' on a substitutional basis invariably introduces assumptions of the synthetic variety, resulting in a circular argument. Thus, this kind of substitutability does not provide an adequate explanation of synonyms.

See also 
 Analytic–synthetic distinction
 Duhem–Quine thesis
 Internal-external distinction
 Meaning (linguistics)
 Meta-ontology
 Naturalized epistemology
 Philosophy of language
 Radical interpretation
 Radical translation
 Two Dogmas of Empiricism

References

Further reading
Dagfinn Føllesdal.  1973.  "Indeterminacy of Translation and Under-Determination of the Theory of Nature." Dialectica 27: 289–301.
Roger F. Gibson. 1986. "Translation, physics, and facts of the matter."  In The Philosophy of W. V. Quine.  The Library of Living Philosophers.  Edited by  L.E. Hahn and Paul Arthur Schilpp.  Open Court:  La Salle, 1986, pp. 139–154.
Dagfinn Føllesdal, ed.  2000–2001.  Indeterminacy of Translation. Vol. 3 of Philosophy of Quine. 5 vols.  New York:  Garland.

External links

20th-century philosophy
Philosophy of language
Willard Van Orman Quine
Translation